SpinLaunch is a spaceflight technology development company working on mass accelerator technology to move payloads to space. As of September 2022, the company has raised US$150 million in funding, with investors including Kleiner Perkins, Google Ventures, Airbus Ventures, ATW Partners, Catapult Ventures, Lauder Partners, John Doerr, and the Byers Family.

History 
SpinLaunch was founded in 2014 by Jonathan Yaney in Sunnyvale, California. The company's headquarters are in Long Beach. In 2020 it opened a launch site.  SpinLaunch continued development of its 140,000 square-foot (13,000 m2) corporate headquarters in Long Beach, and of its flight test facility at Spaceport America in New Mexico.

In late 2021, SpinLaunch was named one of the "World's Best Employers in the Space Industry" by Everything Space, a recruitment platform specializing in the space industry.  

In March 2022, SpinLaunch was listed as one of the Top 100 Most Influential Companies of 2022 by Time Magazine. In April, SpinLaunch received a launch contract from NASA to test a payload.

Technology 
SpinLaunch is developing a kinetic energy space launch system that reduces dependency on traditional chemical rockets, with the goal of significantly lowering the cost of access to space while increasing the frequency of launch. Peak acceleration would be approximately 10,000 g. If successful, the acceleration concept is projected to lower the cost of launches and to use much less power, with the price of a single space launch reduced by a factor of 20 to under US$500,000.

The SpinLaunch system's historical predecessors include centrifugal guns.

Flight testing 
At Spaceport America in New Mexico on 22 October 2021, SpinLaunch conducted the first vertical test of their accelerator at 20% of its full power capacity, hurling a  passive projectile to an altitude of "tens of thousands of feet."

A September 2022 test flight carried payloads for NASA, Airbus US, Cornell Engineering’s Space Systems Design Studio (SSDS) and Outpost.

Criticism

A number of reasons why this technology may not work have been put forward, including problems with massive spinning objects, potential for catastrophic damage to the payload, incompatibility with traditional liquid rocket fuels, increased atmospheric drag relative to existing technologies, and other potential problems with the idea.

See also 
 Launch service provider
 Non-rocket spacelaunch
 Outline of space technology
 Reusable launch system
 Space gun
 High Altitude Research Facility
 Centrifugal gun

References

External links 
 Official website
 Can We Throw Satellites to Space? - SpinLaunch – Documentary about SpinLaunch on Youtube

Aerospace companies
Aerospace companies of the United States
Private spaceflight companies
Technology companies established in 2014